

Wales

Six Nations Championship

Six Nations results

Magners League

Welsh Premier Division

WRU Division One East 
Beddau RFC won the Division One East League, but were denied promotion to the Premier League as their grounds were deemed to not meet WRU criteria. This ruling was upheld in an EGM by 67% of members.

Division One West
Bonymaen RFC won the Division One West League, but were denied promotion to the Premier League as their grounds were deemed to not meet WRU criteria. This ruling was upheld in an EGM by 67% of members.

Division Two East

Division Two West

References